The Kayan language may be: 
the Padaung language of Burma
any of the Kayan languages of Borneo
the Kaian language of New Guinea